The Aiton language or Tai Aiton language is spoken in Assam, India (in the Dhonsiri Valley and the south bank of the Brahmaputra).  It is currently classified as a threatened language, with less than two thousand speakers worldwide.  Its other names include Antonia and Sham Doaniya.

Classification 
The Aiton language is a part of the Southwestern branch of the Tai family of languages.  There are three other actively spoken languages in this branch: Khamti, Phake, and Khamyang.

History 
The Tai languages in Assam share many grammatical similarities, a writing system, and much of their vocabulary.  The most prominent differences between the languages are their tonal systems.

According to the oral and written records of the Aiton people, they originated from a place named Khao-Khao Mao-Lung, a Burmese state near the Chinese border. It is generally believed that they came to India about two or three hundred years ago, seeking refuge from oppression.  Despite how long they have been in Assam, many members of the older generations are not fluent in Assamese, the official language of the state.

Geographic Distribution
Aiton is spoken predominantly in India, in the northeastern state of Assam.

According to Morey (2005), Aiton is spoken in the following villages:

Buragohain (1998) reports a total of 260 Aiton households, comprising a total population of 2,155.

Phonology

Initial consonants
Morey reports the following initial consonants:

Aiton, like some other Tai languages, have a "minimal three-way contrast in voicing". It also only allows vowels to be voiced stops when they are in bilabial and dental/alveolar places of articulation. Aiton,  has voiced  and four voiced nasals in its sound inventory. It does not have voiceless sonorants.

Final consonants
Aiton has the following final consonants:

-[w] occurs after front vowels and [a]-, -[j] occurs after back vowels and [a]-.

Tones
Aiton today uses three tones, however it originally used five but two have merged with other tones. The first tone still used today is 'mid/high level', the second tone is 'high level then falling' and the third is 'mid falling'. Originally the fourth tone, 'mid rising', has merged with the first tone. The fifth tone, 'mid falling glottalised', has merged with the third tone.

Vowels
Aiton has a vowel system of only seven vowels, which is the smallest out of all the Tai languages spoken in Assam.  From these seven vowels, Aiton allows only nine possible sequences.

Grammar

Pronouns
The following set of pronouns are the pronouns found in the Aiton language:

Demonstratives
Note: the form /-an2/ is a post-clitic form that approaches a definite article in function and may be attached to pronouns and even verbs.

Classifiers
The most common classifiers are kɔ1 for persons, tu1/to1 for animals and ʔan for inanimate objects.

Writing system 

The Tai Aiton have their own writing system called 'Lik-Tai', which they share with the Khamti people and Tai Phake people. It closely resembles the Northern Shan script of Myanmar, which is a variant of the Burmese script, with some of the letters taking divergent shapes.

Consonants
 က - ka - k - [k]
 ၵ - kha - kh - [kʰ]
 င - nga - ng - [ŋ]
 ꩡ - ca - c - [t͡ʃ]
 ꩬ - sa - s - [s]
 ၺ - nya - ny - [ɲ]
 တ - ta - t - [t]
 ထ - tha - th - [tʰ]
 ꩫ - na - n - [n]
 ပ - pa - p - [p]
 ၸ - pha/fa - ph/f - [pʰ/ɸ]
 မ - ma - m - [m]
 ယ - ya/ja - y/j - [j/ɟ]
 ျ - in medial form
 ꩺ - ra - r - [r]
 ြ - in medial form
 လ - la - l - [l]
 ဝ - wa - w - [w]
 ꩭ - ha - h - [h]
 ဢ - a - a - [ʔ]
 ဒ - da - d - [d]
 ဗ - ba/wa - b/w - [b/w]

Vowels
 ႜ - a - [a]
 ႃ - aa - [aː]
 ိ - i - [i]
 ီ - ī - [iː]
 ု - u - [u]
 ူ - ū - [uː]
 ေ - e/ae - [eː/ɛ]
 ႝ - ai - [ai]
  ေႃ - o/aw - [oː/ɔː]
 ံ - ṁ - [ŋ̊]
 ိ်ုွ - ue - [ɯ]
 ်ၞ - aeu - [ɛu]
 ်ွ - aau - [aːu]
 ွဝ် - au - [au]
 ွ - aw - [ɒ]
 ွႝ - oi - [oi]
 ွံ - om - [ɔm]
 ိ်ွ - iu - [ɛu/iu]
 ုံ - um - [um]
 ်ံ - em - [em]
 ် - final consonant, silences inherent vowel

Other symbols
 ꩷ - exclamation mark
 ꩸ - 1
 ꩹ - 2

References

Buragohain, Yehom. 1998. "Some notes on the Tai Phakes of Assam, in Shalardchai Ramitanondh Virada Somswasdi and Ranoo Wichasin." In Tai, pp. 126–143. Chiang Mai, Thailand: Chiang Mai University.
Morey, Stephen. 2005. The Tai languages of Assam: a grammar and texts. Canberra: Pacific Linguistics.

External links 
 PARADISEC open access archive of Aiton language recordings

Languages of Assam
Southwestern Tai languages